Bernborough (1939–1960) was an outstanding Australian-bred Thoroughbred racehorse who competed from 1941 to 1946. He carried heavy weights in 15 consecutive wins that included the Doomben 10,000 while carrying 10 stone 5 pounds.

Bernborough was foaled at Rosalie Plains near the township of Oakey in the Darling Downs in Queensland. The bay colt was by the good sire Emborough (GB) from Bern Maid by Bernard (GB), who was the paternal grandson of Gainsborough, winner of the English Triple Crown in 1918.

Racing record
    
Bernborough first raced under the ownership of  A.E.Hadwin. A Queensland trainer, J. Roberts, then leased the horse. He came to prominence racing at Toowoomba's Clifford Park when ridden to his first six wins by Les Watterson. Bernborough only raced at Toowoomba in Queensland as he was barred from racing at metropolitan tracks because of ownership doubts. His racing colours were orange, purple sleeves, and black cap. His trainer was Harry Plant. When he was six years old, he was moved to Sydney and following his sale to A.O. Romano for 2,600 guineas, his nominations were accepted. Then he began a winning streak of 15 races. His wins included the Newmarket Handicap at Flemington carrying 9 st 13 lb (63 kg) and the Doomben Cup under 10 st 11 lb (68 kg). He started 37 times for 26 wins, 2 seconds, and 1 third.

On 2 November 1946, Bernborough had his last race in the LKS MacKinnon Stakes. Challenging for the lead just after entering the home straight, he suffered torn sesamoid ligaments and had to be pulled up. The great mare Flight, who had finished second to Bernborough on many occasions, went on to win.

1946 racebook

Stud record

After recovering from his injuries, Bernborough was sold for a large sum to movie producer Louis B. Mayer for stud duties in the USA, where he went on to moderate success as a stallion at Spendthrift Farm in Lexington, Kentucky. Here he sired the winners of more than $4,500,000 in prize money and was placed high on the Leading sire in North America list.

Bernborough's progeny included:
 Berseem, champion American sprinter
 Bernwood, established a new world record, 1 min. 33.8 seconds, for a mile.
 First Aid, won the Whitney Handicap and $223,527
 Hook Money, sire of Shandon Belle (won Irish 1,000 Guineas)

Honours
Bernborough was one of the five inaugural inductees into the Australian Racing Hall of Fame, alongside other turf notables Carbine, Phar Lap, Kingston Town, and Tulloch. He is commemorated in the township of Oakey with a life-size bronze statue located outside the Jondaryan Council chambers.

In 1978, he was honoured on a postage stamp issued by Australia Post.

See also
List of leading Thoroughbred racehorses
List of historical horses

References

External links
 Bernborough's pedigree and racing stats
 Australian Museum and Racing Hall of Fame
 Horse Profile - Bernborough

1939 racehorse births
1960 racehorse deaths
Racehorses bred in Australia
Racehorses trained in Australia
Australian Racing Hall of Fame horses
Thoroughbred family 1-u